Chrysis angolensis is a species of cuckoo wasp in the family Chrysididae, found throughout much of the world. It has been recently recorded as being introduced to French Polynesia. The species is a parasite of mud dauber nests, especially the black and yellow mud dauber Sceliphron caementarium.

References

External links

 

Chrysidinae
Hymenoptera of Africa
Insects described in 1881